Kamëz is a municipality in Tirana County, Albania. It was formed at the 2015 local government reform by the merger of the former municipalities Kamëz and Paskuqan, that became municipal units. The seat of the municipality is the town Kamëz. The total population is 104,190 (2011 census), in a total area of 37.20 km2. The population of the former municipality at the 2011 census was 66,841.

Kamëz was one of the applicants for the 2019 European Green Capital Awards, which was won by Oslo.

History

Prior to the 1990s, Kamëz was a sparsely populated and predominantly agricultural area. Following the post 1990s Albanian population movements, the area experienced massive influxes of inhabitants from all over Albania. The newly formed city is known to bear impressive street names belonging to international personalities, capital cities, and organizations.

Subdivisions

The municipality Kamëz consists of the town Kamëz and the following villages:

Sports
The main football team, KS Kamza, plays in the Albanian Second Division at Fusha Sportive Kamëz. It is the site of the Agricultural University of Tirana. The basketball team BC Kamza Basket are 6 times national champions and play their home games at Salla Sportive Bathore.

Twin and sister towns

 Castenaso, Italy
 Kemalpaşa, Turkey
 Macerata, Italy
 Yonkers, United States

Cooperation and friendship
Kamëz also cooperates with:
 Jena, Germany

References

 
Municipalities in Tirana County
Administrative units of Kamëz
Cities in Albania